Welcome to London  is a British romantic thriller produced, written, directed and starring Asad Shan. Set and filmed in the United Kingdom, the film tells the story of Jai, a young  Punjabi man from Delhi who leaves his debt-ridden family in India to fulfill his dream of a brighter future. With luck on his side and a budding romance on the undergrounds of London city, Jai is on his way up until things start to take an unfortunate turn. The film combines elements of crime, drama and romance.

 Welcome to London had its official trailer viewing at the Cannes Film Festival.   The London-based film had a successful UK wide release . It has received critical acclaim after its UK release and has gone on to become the most successful British Hindi language film in the UK.  
The film is slated for release in the Pakistan on 30 January 2015.

The film has received widespread support from the Bollywood fraternity  with actors such as Shahrukh Khan lending advice to the actor, director and filmmaker Asad Shan's debut venture.
Bafta and Oscar-winning editor Chris Dickens served as the creative consultant for the film and has seamlessly blended Bollywood with international film stylistics and techniques.
It has been described "Karan Johar meets Guy Ritchie" by director Asad Shan.

Plot 
Twenty-five-year-old Jai, portrayed by Asad Shan, an impoverished life in Delhi with his humble Punjabi family who he constantly struggles to support. He migrates to London on a three-month tourist visa to fulfill his dream and earn a decent living as an illegal immigrant, leaving his family burdened with a loan. London is his most beautiful dream. Soon he finds a best friend Goldie (Aliakbar Campwala) on a council estate and find love on the London underground in the form of Simran (Sabeeka Imam) who is Shahrukh Khan's biggest fan. One phone call changes his life and he becomes trapped in a dark and dangerous situation leading to an edgy, exciting, fast-paced thriller where each man is on his own and its a jungle law.

Cast 
 Asad Shan as Jai
 Sabeeka Imam as Simran
 Aseem Tiwari as Jason
 Aliakbar Campwala as Goldie
 Javed Khan as Mani
 Sandeep Garcha as Geet
 Patrick Moorhouse as Rich Old Man
 Timur Ahmet as Twins Gangster
 Tim Hibberd as Tony
 Tom Bonington as Shaky Eight
 Dave Reeve as Ringmaster
 Rob Thorne as Big Man 1
 Daniel Jordan as Erratic Jew

Soundtrack 
The soundtrack of the film was released  in various formats. The music is conducted by Blair Mowat with contributions from various artists including Pakistani sensations - Access Band, Falak Shabir and Zuj Jibran to name a few.

References 

2015 films
British drama films
British thriller films
British Pakistani films
2010s Urdu-language films
2010s British films